Jeremiah Francis Shanahan (July 17, 1834 – September 24, 1886) was an American prelate of the Roman Catholic Church. He was the first bishop of the Diocese of Harrisburg in Pennsylvania from 1868 until his death in1886.

Biography

Early life 
Jeremiah Shanahan was born on July 17, 1834, in Silver Lake, Pennsylvania, to John and Margaret (née Donovan) Shanahan, who came to the United States from County Cork, Ireland. After graduating from St. Joseph's Academy near Binghamton, New York in 1852, Jeremiah Shanahan entered St. Charles Borromeo Seminary in Philadelphia.

Priesthood 
Shanahan was ordained to the priesthood by Bishop John Neumann on July 3, 1859. He then served as curate at the Cathedral of Sts. Peter and Paul and rector of the preparatory seminary in Glen Riddle, Pennsylvania.

Bishop of Harrisburg 
On March 3, 1868, Shanahan was appointed the first bishop of the newly erected Diocese of Harrisburg by Pope Pius IX. He received his episcopal consecration on  July 12, 1868, from Bishop James Frederick Wood, with Bishops John McGill and Michael Domenec serving as co-consecrators, at Saints Peter and Paul Cathedral. 

Located in South Central Pennsylvania, the new diocese comprised Adams, Clinton, Columbia, Cumberland, Dauphin, Franklin, Fulton, Juniata, Lancaster, Lebanon, Mifflin, Montour, Northumberland, Perry, Snyder, Union, and York counties. There were 25,000 Catholics, 22 priests, 40 churches and missions, and seven parochial schools.

Upon arriving in Harrisburg, Shanahan became pastor of St. Patrick's Church, which he designated as the cathedral. He opened Sylvan Heights Seminary at Harrisburg in October 1883, and introduced into the diocese the Sisters of Mercy, Sisters of St. Joseph, Sisters of Christian Charity, Sisters of the Holy Cross, and Sisters of Charity. Shanahan presided over a period of great growth, and by the time of his death there were 51 priests, 51 churches, 75 chapels and missions, three orphanages, 29 parochial schools, and over 35,000 Catholics.

Death and legacy 
Jeremiah Shanahan died on September 24, 1886 in Harrisburg at age 52. His younger brother John W. Shanahan also served as Bishop of Harrisburg (1899–1916).

References

1834 births
1886 deaths
St. Charles Borromeo Seminary alumni
People from Susquehanna County, Pennsylvania
Roman Catholic bishops of Harrisburg
19th-century Roman Catholic bishops in the United States